The 2019 Mnet Asian Music Awards ceremony, organized by CJ E&M through its music channel Mnet, took place on December 5 at Nagoya Dome, Japan. It was the 21st ceremony and the one of the largest in the show's history, with more than 40,000 people attending.

Background
In August, Mnet responded to reports regarding the venues of the year's ceremony as Hong Kong, where it had been held in the past, was deemed unsafe due to political conflict in the city. On September 29, Mnet announced that the host location of 2019 MAMA will be at Nagoya, Japan, stating that cultural exchange must continue regardless of political matters.

All songs that are eligible to be nominated are songs released from November 3, 2018, to October 31, 2019.

Criteria

Performers 
The following individuals and groups, listed in order of appearance, presented awards or performed musical numbers.

Presenters 
 Park Bo-gum – host
 Lee Sang-yeob & Jung Hye-sung – presented Best Male & Female Group
 Kim Byung-hyun & Yoon Ji-ni – presented World Performer, Favorite Vocal & Dance Performance
 Shin A-young & Tsukasa Saito – presented Favorite Male & Female Artist
 Lee Yi-kyung & Karata Erika – presented Best New Male & Female Artist
 Jimmy Fallon (recorded at NBC Studios in NYC) – presented Album of the Year
 Kentaro Sakaguchi – presented Best Dance Performance – Male & Female Group
 Lee Sang-yeob & Lee Yu-bi – presented Worldwide Fans' Choice
 Ji Sook & Joo Woo-jae – presented Best Female Artist & Best New Asian Artist
 Lee Kwang-soo & Choi Yu-hwa – presented Worldwide Fans' Choice
 Chang Chen – presented Worldwide Icon of the Year
 Lee Soo-syuk & Gulnazar – presented Best Dance Solo Performance & Best Urban/Hip-Hop Music
 Park Tam-hee – presented Breakthrough Achievement Award
 Cha Sung-won – presented Song of the Year
 Shin Seung-hun – presented Artist of the Year

Winners and nominees
Winners are listed first and highlighted in boldface. Online voting opened on the official MAMA website, Mwave app, and Twitter an hour after the announcement of nominees on October 22, 2019. Voting ended on December 4, 2019.

Main Awards

Favorite Awards

Special Awards

Multiple awards 
The following artist(s) received three or more awards:

Broadcast
The red carpet and main ceremony of the 2019 Mnet Asian Music Awards was broadcast worldwide via Mnet, across CJ E&M channels and other international networks and online via Mnet K-pop's YouTube account and Mnet's official website. The Red Carpet was live streamed on the official Mnet MAMA Twitter page.

 Restricted access on some countries due to broadcasting rights.

References

External links 
 Mnet Asian Music Awards official website (English)

Mnet
Mnet
MAMA Awards ceremonies